Sammach-e Korg (also Romanized as Sammāch-e Korg; also known as Sammāch-e Garag) is a village in Negur Rural District, Dashtiari District, Chabahar County, Sistan and Baluchestan Province, Iran. At the 2006 census, its population was 412, in 69 families.

References 

Populated places in Chabahar County